Six Degrees of Separation is a 1993 American comedy-drama film released by Metro-Goldwyn-Mayer and directed by Fred Schepisi, adapted from John Guare's Pulitzer Prize-nominated 1990 play of the same name.

The plot of the film was inspired by the real-life story of David Hampton, a con man and robber who convinced a number of people in the 1980s that he was the son of actor Sidney Poitier. In October 1983, Hampton came to the New York apartment of Inger McCabe Elliott and her husband Osborn Elliott, who allowed him to spend the night in the apartment. The next morning, Inger found Hampton in bed with another man and later called the police. The Elliotts told their friend, writer John Guare, the story, which inspired him to write the play years later.

Plot
Fifth Avenue socialite Ouisa Kittredge and her art dealer husband Flan are parents of "two at Harvard and a girl at Groton". However, the narrow world inhabited by the Kittredges and their public status as people interested in the arts make them easy prey for Paul. A skillful con-artist, Paul mysteriously appears at their door one night, injured and bleeding, claiming to be a close college friend of their Ivy League kids, as well as the son of Sidney Poitier.

Ouisa and Flan are much impressed by Paul's fine taste, keen wit, articulate literary expositions and surprising culinary skill. His appealing facade soon has the Kittredges putting him up, lending him money and taking satisfaction in his praise for their posh lifestyle. Paul's scheme continues until, after he brings home a hustler, his actual indigence is revealed. The shocked Kittredges kick him out when it is revealed that they are but the most recent victims of the duplicity with which Paul has charmed his way into many upper-crust homes along the Upper East Side.

Paul's schemes become anecdotes which are bantered about at their cocktail parties. In the end, Paul has a profound effect on the many individuals who encounter him, linking them in their shared experience.

Cast
Stockard Channing as Louisa "Ouisa" Kittredge
Will Smith as Paul
Donald Sutherland as Flanders "Flan" Kittredge
Ian McKellen as Geoffrey Miller
Mary Beth Hurt as Kitty
Heather Graham as Elizabeth
Bruce Davison as Larkin
Richard Masur as Dr. Fine
Anthony Michael Hall as Trent Conway
Daniel von Bargen as Detective
Eric Thal as Rick
Kelly Bishop as Adele
Anthony Rapp as Ben
Oz Perkins as Woodrow "Woody" Kittredge (as Osgood Perkins II)
Catherine Kellner as Talbot "Tess" Kittredge
J. J. Abrams as Doug (as Jeffrey Abrams)
Kitty Carlisle as Mrs. Bannister
 Cleo King as Lieutenant Price

Reception 

Accolades
1994 Academy Award for Best Actress Nomination – Stockard Channing
1994 Golden Globe Award for Best Actress – Motion Picture Musical or Comedy Nomination – Stockard Channing

See also

 Six Degrees of Separation (play)

References

External links
 
 
 
 
 

1993 films
1990s mystery comedy-drama films
1993 LGBT-related films
American films based on plays
American mystery comedy-drama films
American satirical films
American LGBT-related films
Films about con artists
Films about social class
Films set in apartment buildings
Films set in New York City
Metro-Goldwyn-Mayer films
Films directed by Fred Schepisi
Films scored by Jerry Goldsmith
1993 comedy films
1993 drama films
Films produced by Arnon Milchan
1990s English-language films
1990s American films